Elections were held in Illinois on Tuesday, November 6, 1956.

Primaries were held on April 10, 1956.

The results strongly favored the Republican Party, which retained control both chambers of the Illinois General Assembly as well as all statewide elected executive offices. They also won the state in the presidential election, retained the U.S. Senate seat up for election, and flipped a single U.S. House seat.

Election information

Turnout
In the primary election turnout was 36.96%, with a total of 1,839,577 ballots cast (961,999 Democratic and 877,578 Republican).

In the general election turnout was 85.95%, with a total of 4,484,956 ballots cast.

Federal elections

United States President 

Illinois voted for the Republican ticket of Dwight D. Eisenhower and Richard Nixon. For the second consecutive election, Illinois' vote for the Republican Eisenhower-Nixon ticket came despite the fact that former Illinois Governor Adlai Stevenson II was the Democratic presidential nominee.

United States Senate 

Republican Senator Everett Dirksen was reelected to a second term.

United States House 

All 25 Illinois seats in the United States House of Representatives were up for election in 1956.

The Republicans flipped one Democratic-held seat, leaving the composition of Illinois' House delegation to consist of 14 Republicans and 11 Democrats.

State elections

Governor

Incumbent Governor William Stratton, a Republican, narrowly won reelection to a second term.

General election
Herbert C. Paschen was replaced by Richard B. Austin as Democratic nominee.

Lieutenant Governor

Incumbent Lieutenant Governor John William Chapman, a Republican, won reelection to a second term.

Democratic primary

Republican primary

General election

Attorney General 

 
Incumbent Attorney General Latham Castle, a Republican, was elected to a second term.

Democratic primary

Republican primary

General election

Secretary of State 

Incumbent Secretary of State Charles F. Carpentier, a Republican, was reelected to a second term.

Democratic primary

Republican primary

General election

Auditor of Public Accounts 

Auditor of Public Accounts Orville Hodge, who had been elected in 1952, was seeking re-election and had won the Republican primary before being charged with 54 counts of bank fraud, embezzlement and forgery relating to a $6.15 million fraud he committed against the state; Hodge was removed from office, pleaded guilty and was sentenced to 12 to 15 years in prison.

Lloyd Morey was appointed in 1957 to replace Hodge, but decided  not to seek reelection. Republican Elbert S. Smith was elected to succeed Morey.

Democratic primary

Republican primary

General election

Treasurer 

Incumbent Treasurer Warren Wright, a Republican, did not seek reelection to a second-consecutive (third overall) term, instead opting to run (ultimately unsuccessfully) for the Republican nomination for governor. Republican Elmer J. Hoffman was elected to succeed him in office, earning Hoffman a second non-consecutive term as Treasurer.

This was the first Illinois Treasurer election to a four-year term, as voters approved a constitutional amendment in 1954 which extended term length from two to four-years beginning in 1956.

Democratic primary

Republican primary

General election

Clerk of the Supreme Court 

Incumbent Clerk of the Supreme Court Fae Searcy, a Republican appointed after the death in office of her husband Earle Benjamin Searcy, won reelection to a first full term.

Instead of being listed by her own name, Searcy opted to be listed on the ballot in both the primary and general election as "Ms. Earle Benjamin Searcy".

Democratic primary

Republican primary

General election

State Senate
Seats of the Illinois Senate were up for election in 1960. Republicans retained control of the chamber.

State House of Representatives
Seats in the Illinois House of Representatives were up for election in 1956. Republicans retained control of the chamber.

Trustees of University of Illinois

An election using cumulative voting was held for three of the nine seats for Trustees of University of Illinois. All three Republican nominees won. The election was for 6-year terms.

Incumbent Republican Wayne A. Johnston  won a second term. Incumbent Republican Timothy W. Swain, appointed in 1955 after the resignation of Red Grange, won election to his first full term. Also, joining them in winning election, was Republican Earl M. Hughes. Incumbent first-term Republican Herbert B. Megran had not been nominated for reelection.

Judicial elections
On April 10, special elections were held for vacancies on the Third and Sixteenth Judicial Circuit Districts. On November 2, special elections were held for three vacancies on the Superior Court of Cook County.

Ballot measures
Two ballot measures, were put before Illinois voters in 1956.

General Banking Law Amendment  
Voters approved the General Banking Law Amendment a legislatively referred state statute which modified the state's banking law.

Revenue Amendment 
The Revenue Amendment, a legislatively referred constitutional amendment which would have amended Article IX Sections 1, 2, 3, 9 and 10 and repeal Article IX Section 13 of the 1870 Constitution of Illinois to give more leeway to the legislature in creating tax policy, while specifically forbidding the authorization of a graduated income tax, failed to meet either threshold for adoption. In order for constitutional amendments to pass, they required either two-thirds support among those specifically voting on the measure or 50% support among all ballots cast in the elections.

Local elections
Local elections were held.

References

 
Illinois